Antonius was a neoplatonist philosopher from the 4th century AD. He was a son of Eustathius and Sosipatra, and had a school at Canopus, near Alexandria in Egypt. He devoted himself wholly to those who sought his instructions, but he never expressed any opinion upon religious topics, which he considered beyond man's comprehension. He and his disciples were strongly attached to the pre-Christian Roman religions; but he had acuteness enough to see that Christianity was fast becoming the dominant religion, and he predicted that after his death all the splendid temples of the gods would be changed into tombs. His moral conduct is described as truly exemplary.

Notes

4th-century Egyptian people
Ancient Alexandrians
Neoplatonists